The term  rebel league has been used to characterize several sports leagues including:

All-America Football Conference
American Basketball Association
American Basketball League (1961–63) 
American Football League
Continental League
Indian Cricket League
Mexican League
United States Football League
World Football League
World Hockey Association